Longji is a town in Longsheng Various Nationalities Autonomous County, Guangxi, China. Longji is known worldwide for Longsheng Rice Terraces.

Administrative division
As of 2016, the town is divided into fifteen villages and one community:
 Heping Community 
 Heping
 Daliu
 Baishui
 Yueqiao
 Bailing
 Baishi
 Jinjiang
 Longji
 Ping'an
 Huangjiang
 Mahai
 Zhongliu
 Dazhai
 Xiaozhai
 Jiangliu

History
Longji came under the jurisdiction of Yining County in the Qing dynasty (1644–1911).

In 1916, it belonged to the South District. In 1933, it was under the jurisdiction of Zhennan Township.

It known as Guanya Township in May 1952 and renamed "Heping Township" on December 26 of that same year. On August 30, 1958, Heping Commune was founded and was revoked in August 1984. On January 2, 2014, it was upgraded to a town.

Geography
The town is situated at southeastern Longsheng Various Nationalities Autonomous County. The town is bordered to the north by Sishui Township, to the northeast by Jiangdi Township, to the south by Lingui District. to the southeast by Lingchuan County, and to the west by Longsheng Town.

The Heping Stream, a tributary of the Xun River, winds through the town.

Economy
Tourism is a significant part of the economy. The region abounds with gold.

Tourist attractions
The Longsheng Rice Terraces is a famous scenic spot in China.

Transportation
The China National Highway 321, commonly referred to as "G321", is a north–south highway passing through the town.

The G65 Baotou–Maoming Expressway, more commonly known as "Bao-Mao Expressway", runs north to south of the town.

Gallery

References

Bibliography

Towns of Guilin